The Visit is a British television programme written by stand-up comedian Tony Burgess. Starring Iain McKee and Steve Edge, the series revolves around the visiting room of the HMP Radford Hill, a category C prison.

The BBC revealed The Visit is part of a series trilogy with I'm With Stupid and Thieves Like Us.

Plot outline
Stray sheep, dodgy drug deals and snatched conjugal rights are common, as the inmates of HMP Radford Hill are reunited with family and friends on their weekly visits. The series follows two prisoners as they entertain visitors on a weekly basis. Michael, in prison for a  jewellery robbery he didn't commit, is awaiting the outcome of his appeal. His weekly visits consist of his father, his Nan, and his younger brother Stevie. Clint, a gambling addict, suffers from a lack of social grace and the interesting habits of his nine-year-old son. His weekly visits consist of his wife and infant children.

Characters

Michael
Played by Iain McKee: Michael has taken the rap for a jewellery robbery. He refused to grass the other robbers, meaning he is the one to get locked up while the real culprits remain free, one of which was his brother, Stevie. However to save his brother from the prison sentence Michael took the fall for him.

Clint
Played by Steve Edge: Gambling addict Clint is desperate to prove his machismo but what chance has he got when his wife – the long-suffering Bev – does not take him seriously.  His unseen nine-year-old son Jamie is constant source of comedy and anxiety (at least on Clint's part) with ongoing references to his unhealthy interests of dolls, skipping and stage musicals.  Clint has an unfortunate ability to say the wrong thing at the wrong time and upset those around him.

Splodge Costello
Played by Stephen Walters: Mancunian Splodge is campaigning for the right to additional toilet paper rolls, which landed him in a stint of solitary confinement. Most of the prison inmates and staff are afraid of him, and he knows it. Splodge spends most of his visiting time waiting for his girlfriend, Zoe, who is habitually late, and harassing the other inmates.

Blind Pete
Played by Vincent Davies: Pete, or "Blind Pete" as he's known within the prison, uses his disability to his advantage in any way that he can. Many of the other prisoners suspect that all is not what it seems and that Pete may actually be able to see.

Brian
Played by John Henshaw: Michael's father and a local taxi driver, Brian drives the family to the prison each week for their visit. A bit of a complainer with an unhealthy obsession with speed bump, he's still a loyal family man.

Stevie
Played by Craig Fitzpatrick: Michael's younger brother, Stevie is not too concerned with anything but women and weed. During visits he likes to wind his father and brother up while convincing his Nan to pay for anything he thinks he needs.

Nana
Played by Beatrice Kelley: If any soul needs saving, Nana knows it's her grandson. She insists on sending Michael every religious icon she can find, has made friends with all of the local Catholic Priests, and thinks that Father Kane can solve any problem.

Bev
Played by Naomi Radcliffe: Clint's long-suffering wife, Bev spends much of her time campaigning for better playground facilities in the visiting room for her twins. Loyal, rational, and calm, she is often frustrated with her husband's gambling on the inside while she struggles to make ends meet on the outside.

Zoe
Played by Rebecca Richamond: Splodge's girlfriend and the mother of his child, Zoe often misses visits or is late. She turns the heads of most of the other inmates, much to the dismay of their girlfriends and wives.

Officer Mark Bamford
Played by Darren Tighe: Prison Officer Bamford likes to keep a tight ship. However the harder he tries the more of a fool he makes himself look. Bamford is usually at the end of fellow prison officer, Russell's jokes, with Bamford always calling Russell a twat behind his back once he has become the butt of the joke.

Officer Russell
Played by Neil Bell: Crunchies are the most important thing in Officer Russel's day. Relaxed and focused on chocolate, he spends most of his day wondering how much time is left in his shift.

Officer Rachel
Played by Angel Coulby: Well liked by the prisoners due to her wit and sarcasm, Officer Rachel is both good at her job and more than willing to put the other guards in their place.

Cast
 Iain McKee ... Michael
 John Henshaw ... Dad
 Craig Fitzpatrick ... Stevie
 Beatrice Kelly ... Nana
 Steve Edge ... Clint
 Naomi Radcliffe ... Bev
 Angel Coulby ... Officer Rachael
 Darren Tighe ... Officer Mark Bamford
 Neil Bell ... Officer Russell
 Vincent Davies ... Pete
Stephen Walters (Credited as Stephen Martin Walters)... Splodge
Rebecca Richmond... Zoe

Episodes

References

External links
 

2000s British sitcoms
2007 British television series debuts
2007 British television series endings
BBC high definition shows
BBC television sitcoms
2000s British teen sitcoms
English-language television shows